Bircham is a civil parish in the English county of Norfolk. It includes the three villages of Great Bircham, Bircham Newton and Bircham Tofts. The parish is located about 12 miles (20 km) north-east of the town of King's Lynn and 37 miles (60 km) north-west of the city of Norwich.

The civil parish has an area of 9.58 square miles (24.82 km2) and in the 2011 census had a population of 448 in 202 households. For the purposes of local government, the parish falls within the district of King's Lynn and West Norfolk.

References

External links
 History of Great Bircham windmill

External links

Villages in Norfolk
King's Lynn and West Norfolk
Civil parishes in Norfolk